Ctenochaetus hawaiiensis (commonly known as chevron tang, but also known as black surgeonfish, Hawaiian bristletooth, Hawaiian kole or Hawaiian surgeonfish) are a species of reef surgeonfish in the family Acanthuridae. They were first described by ichthyologist John Ernest Randall in 1955.

Description
As juveniles, these fish are dark orange in color, with blue chevron marks on their sides. These marks are where this fish receives its name. As the fish ages, it turns black in color with blue horizontal stripes. The mouth on this fish is typically puckered, and they have a row of 30 teeth.

Like all surgeonfish, C. hawaiiensis have a sharp spines on each side of their caudal peduncle that they use for defense. The spines are relatively small when compared to other surgeonfish.

Distribution
Ctenochaetus hawaiiensis are found throughout parts of the Central Pacific Ocean, namely the Hawaiian Islands. They have been seen as far west as Micronesia.

Habitat
As juveniles, C. hawaiiensis are found solitary in areas dense with coral, typically 60–100 feet below the waters surface. Adults can be found closer to the surface in surging water, which is typically highly oxygenated as a result of increased surface tension. As adults, they are known to be found in non-reef environments.

References

Acanthuridae
Fish described in 1955